Hong Kong councillor is a title for the members of Legislative Council and District Councils.
 For the members of Legislative Council, see Legislative Council of Hong Kong
 For the members of District Councils, see District Councils of Hong Kong
In the history, Hong Kong councillor also means
 For the members of Urban Council, see Urban Council
 For the members of Regional Council, see Regional Council (Hong Kong)
 For the members of Executive Council before transfer of sovereignty, see Executive Council of Hong Kong
After transfer of sovereignty, the members of Executive Council are not titled councillor